Eliška Fürstová (married name Krejčová), is a former international table tennis player from Czechoslovakia.

She won seven bronze medals at the World Table Tennis Championships.

Her first two bronze medals came in the team events in 1947 and 1948. The following year she won a third bronze with Ida Koťátková in the women's doubles at the 1949 World Table Tennis Championships. In 1950 she won three more medals in the Corbillon Cup (team event), the doubles with Kveta Hrusakova and the mixed doubles with Ivan Andreadis. 

Her final medal came in 1955 in the mixed doubles with Ladislav Štípek when she played under her married name of Krejčová. She won 14 European titles  and 17 national titles.

See also
 List of table tennis players
 List of World Table Tennis Championships medalists

References

Czechoslovak table tennis players
1927 births
Possibly living people
World Table Tennis Championships medalists